Estádio do Club Athletico Paulistano, commonly known as Estádio Jardim América, was a football stadium located in São Paulo, Brazil. It was the home stadium of Paulistano and it had a maximum capacity of 15,000 people.

History
The stadium was inaugurated on October 29, 1917, when a São Paulo State combined team defeated Dublin FC of Uruguay 1–0. The stadium was demolished in 1950.

References

Defunct football venues in Brazil
Sports venues demolished in 1950